Live – D.C. Bumpin' Y'all (also titled as Live '87) is a double-live album released in 1987 by the Washington, D.C.-based go-go band Chuck Brown & the Soul Searchers. The album was recorded live at The Crystal Skate in Temple Hills, Maryland.

Track listing

Personnel
 Chuck Brown – lead vocals, electric guitar
 John M. Buchannan – keyboards, trombone
 Leroy Fleming – tenor saxophone, background vocals
 Curtis Johnson – keyboards
 Donald Tillery – trumpet, background vocals
 Ricardo D. Wellman – drums
 Rowland Smith – congas, background vocals
 Glenn Ellis – bass guitar, percussion
 Reo Edwards – producer, executive producer, mixing
 Stephan Meyner – executive producer

References

External links
Live – D.C. Bumpin' Y'all at Discogs

1987 live albums
Chuck Brown albums
Live rhythm and blues albums